Horace H. Dediu (born February 25, 1968) is a Romanian-American industry analyst with a focus on mobile phones and especially Apple Inc., as well as micromobility.

He is known for his analysis of Apple's business strategy and predictions of their financials. He hosts the podcasts The Critical Path and Asymcar on 5by5 Studios, the podcast Significant Digits with Ben Bajarin, podcast Micromobility with Oliver Bruce and blogs at Asymco.

Early life and education
Dediu was born in Romania, then went to high school in Medford, Massachusetts, after his parents emigrated to the United States.

After receiving a Master of Science degree in computer engineering from Tufts University, located in Medford, he received a Master of Business Administration degree from Harvard University, located in Cambridge, Massachusetts. He was a student of Clayton Christensen, and frequently cites Christensen in his podcasts and on his website.

Career
Dediu was an analyst for Nokia in Helsinki, Finland, from February 2001 to April 2009, (with responsibility for Research in Motion and Microsoft).

He founded Asymco in April 2010.

Dediu also writes for the Harvard Business Review Blog, and is often interviewed by other news sources as an Apple expert.

See also

 List of Harvard University people
 List of non-fiction writers
 List of people from Massachusetts
 List of Tufts University people

References

External links
Asymco
Asymcar
The Critical Path

1968 births
Place of birth missing (living people)
20th-century American non-fiction writers
20th-century American male writers
21st-century American non-fiction writers
5by5 Studios
American male bloggers
American bloggers
American expatriates in Finland
American freelance journalists
American magazine journalists
American male journalists
American technology journalists
Harvard Business School alumni
Living people
Micromobility
People from Medford, Massachusetts
Romanian emigrants to the United States
Tufts University alumni
Tufts University School of Engineering alumni
Writers from Massachusetts